Bonnie Mitchell is a Democratic former member of the New Hampshire House of Representatives, representing the Cheshire 7th District from 2004 to 2010. Mitchell also participated in Hillary Clinton's 2002 Senate campaign and was the town chair of Howard Dean's 2004 presidential campaign. Her voting record shows she voted for marijuana decriminalization, legalizing same-sex marriage, abolishing the death penalty, and campaign finance reform.

References

External links
New Hampshire House of Representatives - Bonnie Mitchell official NH House website
Project Vote Smart - Representative Bonnie Mitchell (NH) profile
Follow the Money - Bonnie Mitchell
2006 2004 campaign contributions

Members of the New Hampshire House of Representatives
1941 births
Living people
Harvard University alumni
Women state legislators in New Hampshire
People from Oak Hill, Ohio
21st-century American women